HTML5test is a web application for evaluating a web browser's accuracy in implementing the web standards HTML5 and Web SQL Database (developed by the World Wide Web Consortium), as well as the WebGL standard (developed by the Mozilla Foundation and the Khronos Group).

The test suite was developed by Dutch web programmer Niels Leenheer, and published in March 2010. To test a web browser, the user must visit the home page of the website which is located at html5test.com. The application returns an integer score out of a possible 555 points. The point total has changed multiple times through the evolution of the software; Leenheer introduced the present scoring system as part of a major redesign of the test introduced in November 2013.

HTML5test evaluates the browser's support for Web storage, the W3C Geolocation API, HTML5-specific HTML elements (including the canvas element), and other features. It does not evaluate a browser's conformance to other web standards, such as Cascading Style Sheets, ECMAScript, Scalable Vector Graphics, or the Document Object Model. Conformance testing for those standards is within the purview of Acid3, an automated test published by Ian Hickson in 2008. Similarly, Acid3 does not evaluate a browser's HTML5 conformance. The test scope of HTML5test and the test scope of Acid3 are mutually exclusive.

As of July 2020, the maximum score is 555 and Google Chrome scores 535, Microsoft Edge 84 scores 532, Falkon 3.1.0 scores 528, Opera 45 scores 518, Mozilla Firefox 68 scores 513, GNOME Web 3.36 scores 432 and Internet Explorer 11 scores 312.

See also
 Acid1
 Acid2
 Acid3
 XHTML

References

External links
 
 

Computing websites
Dutch websites
HTML5
Internet properties established in 2010
Web 2.0
Web software
Software testing tools